Cornice Peak may refer to any of three mountain peaks in British Columbia and Alberta:

Cornice Peak (Canadian Rockies), in the Continental Ranges of the Rocky Mountains in Alberta
Cornice Peak (Selkirk Mountains), in the Sir Sandford Range of the Selkirk Mountains in British Columbia
Cornice Peak (Kitimat Ranges), in the Kitimat Ranges of the Coast Mountains in British Columbia

See also
Cornice Mountain (Stikine Icecap)
Cornice Mountain (Cambria Icefield)
Cornice Ridge
Cornice